Leptospermum liversidgei, commonly known as the olive tea-tree, is a species of compact shrub that is endemic to eastern Australia. It has narrow egg-shaped, lemon-scented leaves, white or pink flowers and woody fruit that remain on the plant at maturity.

Description

Taxonomy and naming
Leptospermum liversidgei was first formally described in 1905 by Richard Thomas Baker and Henry George Smith in the Journal and Proceedings of the Royal Society of New South Wales.
The specific epithet (liversidgei) honours Archibald Liversidge.

Distribution and habitat
Olive tea-tree occurs in coastal swamps between the Bundaberg region of Queensland and Tomago in New South Wales where it grows in heath.

Use in horticulture
The size of this tea-tree makes it suitable for smaller gardens where it will tolerate poorly-drained soil and at least moderate frost. The leaves contain the essential oil citronellal and the plant is sometimes alleged to repel mosquitoes.

References

 Harden, G.J., Flora of New South Wales, Volume 2, .

liversidgei
Flora of New South Wales
Myrtales of Australia
Plants described in 1905
Taxa named by Richard Thomas Baker